Auckland Institute of Studies (AIS) (formerly AIS St Helens; Māori: Te Whare Wānanga ki Hato Herena) is the largest privately owned tertiary institute in Auckland, New Zealand.

AIS was established in 1990, in Auckland's Downtown shopping centre. It moved into the former St Helens Maternity Hospital in Mt Albert, Auckland in 1993, after converting it into a tertiary residential campus.

The institute now has two campuses in Mt Albert: St Helens Campus, located at 28a Linwood Ave and Asquith Campus, located at 120 Asquith Ave.

AIS offers bachelor and masters level degree programmes in business, information technology, tourism management, and hospitality management. The institute's own English Language Centre offers a range of English language courses including English teacher training (CertTESOL).

The institute is closely affiliated with the Centre for Research in International Education (CRIE).

Courses

Study areas

Qualifications
 2 masters degrees
 7 postgraduate and graduate diplomas and certificates 
 4 bachelors degree programmes 
 7 diploma and certificate programmes

Educational and Industry Links
AIS has strategic alliances and articulation agreements (see MOU) with the following education institutions in New Zealand and overseas:

New Zealand

International

Industry Links
The institute has strong links within the hospitality industry which facilitates internship and job placement opportunities for hospitality students.

Internships
AIS offers internship opportunities in various industries to graduates and current students via a specialist organisation Intern NZ . Internship placements are coordinated via the institute's Student Careers Centre (SCC).

References

Universities and colleges in New Zealand
Education in Auckland
Educational institutions established in 1990
1990 establishments in New Zealand